Tomorrow is Another Day is about a middle-aged woman struggling to take care of her autistic son for 20 years and discovered that her husband is having an extramarital affair. The film was directed by Chan Tai-lee with actress Teresa Mo and actor Ling Man-lung.

The movie was screened as special presentation at Hong Kong Asian Film Festival 2017. Teresa Mo also won the Best Actress Award for the 37th Hong Kong Film Awards.

Plot summary

Cast
 Teresa Mo
 Ray Lui
 Prudence Liew
 Bonnie Xian Seli
 Ling Man-lung
 Candice Yu
 Joyce Cheng
 Elvina Kong
 June Lam

References

External links 
 Tomorrow is Another Day at hkmdb.com
 
 

Cantonese-language films
2017 drama films